The Fortified Sector of Montbéliard (Secteur Fortifié de Montbéliard) was the French military organization that in 1940 controlled the section of the French border with Switzerland in the vicinity of Montbéliard. The Montbéliard sector stands in the vicinity of the Belfort Gap, a traditional invasion route into eastern France. However, the area was lightly defended, as the Swiss border was not regarded as an area with a high risk of invasion, and because the left bank of the Rhine was firmly in French hands.

Concept and organization

The Montbéliard sector was chiefly composed  of old Séré de Rivières system fortifications constructed to defend the Belfort Gap. The main positions were the Fort du Mont Bart and the Fort du Lomont.

Command
The Montbéliard sector was under the command of the Fortified Region of Belfort until 16 March 1940, when the Belfort region became the 44th Army Fortress Corps (44e Corps d'Armée de Forteresse), retaining the Montbéliard sector under its command. The sector's commanding general was General de Bizemont until 19 May 1940, then Colonel Gard, with a command post at the Fort de Lomont. The sector was known as the Defensive Sector of Montbéliard until 16 March 1940. No field army forces were assigned to the sector. At the midpoint of the Battle of France on 1 June 1940, the troops of the SF Montbéliard amounted to a chasseurs pyrénéens regiment in two battalions, comprising 235 officers and 7,390 men.

References

Bibliography 
Allcorn, William. The Maginot Line 1928-45. Oxford: Osprey Publishing, 2003. 
Kaufmann, J.E. and Kaufmann, H.W. Fortress France: The Maginot Line and French Defenses in World War II, Stackpole Books, 2006. 
Kaufmann, J.E., Kaufmann, H.W., Jancovič-Potočnik, A. and Lang, P. The Maginot Line: History and Guide, Pen and Sword, 2011. 
Mary, Jean-Yves; Hohnadel, Alain; Sicard, Jacques. Hommes et Ouvrages de la Ligne Maginot, Tome 1. Paris, Histoire & Collections, 2001.  
Mary, Jean-Yves; Hohnadel, Alain; Sicard, Jacques. Hommes et Ouvrages de la Ligne Maginot, Tome 3. Paris, Histoire & Collections, 2003.  
Mary, Jean-Yves; Hohnadel, Alain; Sicard, Jacques. Hommes et Ouvrages de la Ligne Maginot, Tome 5. Paris, Histoire & Collections, 2009.  
Romanych, Marc; Rupp, Martin. Maginot Line 1940: Battles on the French Frontier. Oxford: Osprey Publishing, 2010.

External links
 Le Secteur Défensif  de Montbelliard  at wikimaginot.eu 

 
French border defenses before World War II